Rachael Killian (born 15 July 1994) is an Australian rules footballer who played for the Adelaide Football Club in the AFL Women's competition. She was drafted by Adelaide with their ninth selection and seventy-first overall in the 2016 AFL Women's draft. She missed the round five match against  at Norwood Oval as a late withdrawal, before returning for the round six match against  at TIO Stadium. She was a part of Adelaide's premiership side after the club defeated  by six points at Metricon Stadium in the AFL Women's Grand Final. She played managed six matches in her debut season.

Adelaide signed Killian for the 2018 season during the trade period in May 2017. She was delisted by Adelaide at the end of the 2018 season due to injury.

References

External links 

1994 births
Living people
Adelaide Football Club (AFLW) players
Australian rules footballers from South Australia